Lake Acchicocha (possibly from Quechua aqchi hawk or sparrowhawk, qucha lake,"hawk lake") is a lake in Peru located in the Junín Region, Huancayo Province, Chongos Alto District. Lake Acchicocha lies south of Yurajcocha, southeast of Huichicocha, northeast of Huarmicocha and north of Canllacocha.

References 

Lakes of Peru
Lakes of Junín Region